The Oldenburg Class S 5 steam engine was a German locomotive built for the Grand Duchy of Oldenburg State Railways (Großherzoglich Oldenburgische Staatseisenbahnen) between 1909 and 1913. It was based on the Prussian S 5.2 and, like its predecessor, the Class S 3, it was procured for the route between Wilhelmshaven, Oldenburg and Bremen.

Eleven engines were manufactured by Hanomag between 1909 and 1913. They differed in several technical points from their Prussian cousins, for example they had a Lentz valve gear. Even the running plate was higher than the Prussian S 5.2 so that wheel arches could be omitted. They had Ranafier starting equipment.

The locomotives were given the names of German divinities. The Deutsche Reichsbahn took over all eleven engines, classifying them as DRG Class 13.18 and allocating them numbers 13 1851 to 13 1861. They were retired by 1927.

See also 
Grand Duchy of Oldenburg State Railways
List of Oldenburg locomotives and railbuses
Länderbahnen

Bibliography 

4-4-0 locomotives
S 05
Railway locomotives introduced in 1909
Hanomag locomotives
Standard gauge locomotives of Germany
2′B n2v locomotives

Passenger locomotives